Quilombo River may refer to:

 Quilombo River (Juquiá River), Brazil
 Quilombo River (Moji-Guaçu River), Brazil

See also
 Quilombo (disambiguation)
 River (disambiguation)